The Dun & Bradstreet Corporation is an American company that provides commercial data, analytics, and insights for businesses. Headquartered in Jacksonville, Florida, the company offers a wide range of products and services for risk and financial analysis, operations and supply, and sales and marketing professionals, as well as research and insights on global business issues. It serves customers in government and industries such as communications, technology, strategic financial services, and retail, telecommunications, and manufacturing markets. Often referred to as D&B, the company's database contains over 500 million business records worldwide.

History

1800s
Dun & Bradstreet traces its history to July 20, 1841, with formation of The Mercantile Agency in New York City by Lewis Tappan. Recognizing the need for a centralized credit reporting system, Tappan formed the company to create a network of correspondents who would provide reliable, objective credit information to subscribers. As an advocate for civil rights, Tappan used his abolitionist connections to expand and update the company's credit information.

Despite accusations of personal privacy invasion, by 1844 the Mercantile Agency had over 280 clients. The agency continued to expand, opening offices in Boston, Philadelphia, and Baltimore. By 1849, Tappan retired, allowing Benjamin Douglass to take over the booming business.

In 1859, Douglass transferred the company to Robert Graham Dun, who immediately changed the firm's name to R. G. Dun & Company. Over the next 40 years, Graham Dun continued to expand the business across international boundaries.

1900s
In March 1933, Dun merged with competitor John M. Bradstreet to form today's Dun & Bradstreet. The merger was engineered by Dun's CEO, Arthur Whiteside. Whiteside's successor, J. Wilson Newman, worked to extend the company's range of products and services, expanding the company dramatically during the 1960s by engineering ways to apply new technologies to evolving operations. 

Moody's, a credit reporting agency, was acquired by Dun & Bradstreet in 1962. The Dun & Bradstreet Data Universal Numbering System (D&B D-U-N-S Number) was invented in 1963. Other companies acquired during this time included R.H. Donnelley, Official Airline Guides, Thomas Y. Crowell Co., Funk & Wagnalls, Technical Publishing, and McCormack & Dodge, all since divested.

In 1986, Dun & Bradstreet acquired the education data company Market Data Retrieval (MDR). That year, Dun & Bradstreet sold Technical Publishing to Cahners Publishing.

In 1996, the company restructured, creating three entities: Dun & Bradstreet, Nielsen, and the Cognizant Corporation. Cognizant Corporation included Nielsen TV Ratings, Gartner Group, Clarke-O'Neill, Erisco, and several other lesser known entities. In 1999, Cognizant Corporation spun off Nielsen TV Ratings and shortly thereafter divested all its holdings, emerging as IMS Health. IMS Health continued to hold its prize incubator company that is today known as Cognizant Corporation.

On July 1, 1998, Dun & Bradstreet split into two companies, one assuming the Dun & Bradstreet name, while the other adopting the R.H. Donnelley name.

2000s
In 2000, Dun & Bradstreet spun off Moody's Corporation.

In 2001, Dun & Bradstreet acquired Harris InfoSource International, Inc., a data company. In February 2003, the company acquired Hoover's, a business reporting service.

On February 5, 2003, Dun & Bradstreet restated prior period results to correct timing errors in recognizing some of the revenue associated with 14 of the company's 200+ products, after reviewing its revenue recognition from 1997 through 2002. In August 2010, Dun & Bradstreet spun off and sold its credit monitoring and management business to a newly formed company, Dun & Bradstreet Credibility Corp. In 2007, Dun & Bradstreet acquired AllBusiness.com and sold the company in 2012.

In October 2013, Bob Carrigan became the CEO of Dun & Bradstreet.

On January 5, 2015, Dun & Bradstreet acquired the data management firm NetProspex. In April 2015, Dun & Bradstreet acquired Dun & Bradstreet Credibility Corp. and announced the formation of a new division, Dun & Bradstreet Emerging Business. In January 2017, Dun & Bradstreet acquired Avention, the maker of OneSource solutions.

On August 8, 2018, Dun & Bradstreet announced the appointment of Thomas J. Manning, who had served as the company's interim CEO, as its new Chief Executive Officer, and that the company had entered into a definitive agreement to be acquired by an investor group led by CC Capital, Cannae Holdings, and Thomas H. Lee Partners.

On February 8, 2019, the investor group completed the acquisition of Dun & Bradstreet and it became a privately held company. Its former ticker symbol, DNB, was retired.

On July 1, 2020, Dun & Bradstreet re-listed shares on the New York Stock Exchange, once again trading under the ticker symbol DNB.

On May 20, 2021, Dun & Bradstreet announced its intention to moving its global headquarters to Jacksonville, Florida.

Operations 
The company generates revenue through subscription-based products, business information reports, data licensing agreements, strategic partnerships, and concierge services.

The company derives revenues through two segments: Americas and non-Americas.

Americas consists of:
 United States and Canada
 (The company divested its Latin America operations in September 2016)

Non-Americas consists of:
 Europe
 The United Kingdom
 Ireland
 Greater China (including Hong Kong and Taiwan)
 India
 (Netherlands and Belgium operations were divested in November 2016)
 (Australian and New Zealand operations were divested in June 2015 to Archer Capital for $169.8 million and were rebranded as illion in 2018, with debt collection operations being formally rebranded as Milton Graham on 14 June 2018)

Products and services 
Dun & Bradstreet offers various products and services solving for credit, risk, marketing, sales, analytics, and more, including D&B Hoovers, Master Data, and D&B Data Exchange.

See also 

 Credit rating agencies
 Mercantile agencies

References

External links

 Dun & Bradstreet Corporation Records at Baker Library Historical Collections, Harvard Business School
 

 
Business services companies of the United States
Companies listed on the New York Stock Exchange
Companies based in Essex County, New Jersey
Credit rating agencies
Millburn, New Jersey
Data brokers
American companies established in 1841
1841 establishments in New York (state)
2019 mergers and acquisitions
Private equity portfolio companies
Lewis Tappan
2020 initial public offerings
Companies based in Jacksonville, Florida
Technology companies based in the Jacksonville area
Technology companies based in Florida
Multinational companies headquartered in the United States
Publicly traded companies based in Jacksonville, Florida
Multinational companies based in Jacksonville